The Rolling Stones' 1965 1st British Tour was a concert tour by the band. The tour commenced on March 5 and concluded on March 18, 1965.
Parts of the Liverpool (March 6) and Manchester (March 7) shows were recorded for Got Live If You Want It!—the third official EP by The Rolling Stones.

The Rolling Stones 
 Mick Jagger - lead vocals, harmonica, percussion
 Keith Richards - guitar, backing vocals
 Brian Jones - guitar, harmonica, backing vocals
 Bill Wyman - bass guitar, backing vocals
 Charlie Watts - drums

Tour set list
"Everybody Needs Somebody To Love" (intro)
"Pain In My Heart"
"Down The Road Apiece"
"Time Is On My Side"
"I'm Alright"
"Little Red Rooster"
"Route 66"
"I'm Moving On"
"The Last Time"
"Everybody Needs Somebody To Love" (full song)

Tour dates 
 05/03/1965 London, Edmonton, Regal Theatre (2 shows)
 06/03/1965 Liverpool, Empire Theatre (2 shows)
 07/03/1965 Manchester, Palace Theatre (2 shows)
 08/03/1965 Scarborough, Futurist Theatre (2 shows)
 09/03/1965 Sunderland, Odeon Theatre (2 shows)
 10/03/1965 Huddersfield, ABC Theatre (2 shows)
 11/03/1965 Sheffield, City Hall (2 shows)
 12/03/1965 Leicester, Trocadero Theatre (2 shows)
 13/03/1965 Rugby, Granada Theatre (2 shows)
 14/03/1965 Rochester, Odeon Theatre (2 shows)
 15/03/1965 Guildford, Odeon Theatre (2 shows)
 16/03/1965 Greenford, Granada Theatre (2 shows)
 17/03/1965 Southend, Odeon Theatre (2 shows)
 18/03/1965 Romford, ABC Theatre (2 shows)

References 
 Carr, Roy.  The Rolling Stones: An Illustrated Record.  Harmony Books, 1976.  

The Rolling Stones concert tours
1965 concert tours
1965 in the United Kingdom
Concert tours of the United Kingdom
March 1965 events in the United Kingdom